Talorc was a king of the Picts in the Early Middle Ages from 778 until 782 He was slain at a location beyond the Mounth in a chronicle that appears to be the first literature reference to the Mounth of the Grampian Mountains.

References
 C. Michael Hogan (2007) Elsick Mounth, The Megalithic Portal, ed. A. Burnham
 William Forbes Skene (1886) Celtic Scotland: A History of Ancient Alban, Published by Douglas, 529 pages

Line notes

782 deaths
Pictish monarchs
Year of birth unknown